The Centro de Reclusión de Máxima Seguridad (CEREC) is a maximum security prison located in Callao at the Callao Naval Base and is one of the most monitored facilities in Peru, holding some of the main members of Shining Path and MRTA.

Detainees

References 

Prisons
Penal system in Peru